Patrik Lê Giang (born 8 September 1992) is a Slovakian football player who currently plays as a goalkeeper for V.League 1 club Cong An Ha Noi. He was a member of the Slovakia national under-21 football team. His older brother Emil is also footballer.

Club career
Le Giang was born in Lučenec. He started off his career in Fiľakovo. He joined the Žilina youth system when he was fifteen. In 2011, he was promoted to the first team of MŠK Žilina. In July 2011, he joined Slovak club Zemplín Michalovce on a one-year loan from Žilina. Patrik made his debut for Michalovce against LAFC Lučenec on 23 July 2011. In June 2012, Le Giang returned to Žilina after his loan spell in Michalovce expired. Le Giang played his first match for Žilina on 15 May 2013 against ViOn Zlaté Moravce.

International career
Although born in Slovakia and available to play for Slovakia, he is also available to represent for Vietnam due to his origin, as well as he also possesses Vietnamese citizenship. He has played for the U19 Slovakia before representing its U21 team, as well as capping for the U23 Vietnam team.

Due to Vietnam's rising successes in football competition since 2019, there have been attempts to recruit the goalie into the Vietnamese team, but it is not clear will he decide to represent Vietnam or not.

Recognitions
On 16 November 2021, FIFPro has awarded Le Giang Merit Award for charitable contributions.

External links
MŠK Žilina profile
Corgoň Liga profile

UEFA profile

See also
 List of Vietnam footballers born outside Vietnam

References

1992 births
Living people
People from Lučenec
Sportspeople from the Banská Bystrica Region
Slovak footballers
Vietnamese footballers
Slovak people of Vietnamese descent
Sportspeople of Vietnamese descent
Slovakia youth international footballers
Slovakia under-21 international footballers
Association football goalkeepers
MŠK Žilina players
MFK Zemplín Michalovce players
FC Sellier & Bellot Vlašim players
MFK Karviná players
1. SK Prostějov players
Bohemians 1905 players
FK Pohronie players

Slovak Super Liga players
2. Liga (Slovakia) players

Czech National Football League players
Expatriate footballers in the Czech Republic
Slovak expatriate sportspeople in the Czech Republic
Expatriate footballers in Vietnam
Slovak expatriate sportspeople in Vietnam
Slovak expatriate footballers